Castleford Cutsyke railway station served the suburb of Cutsyke, in the historical county of Yorkshire, England, from 1860 to 1968 on the Pontefract and Methley Junction Line.

History 
The station was opened on 16 January 1860 by the Lancashire and Yorkshire Railway. 'Cutsyke' was added to its name on 15 September 1952. It closed on 7 October 1968.

References 

Disused railway stations in West Yorkshire
Former Lancashire and Yorkshire Railway stations
Railway stations in Great Britain opened in 1860
Railway stations in Great Britain closed in 1968
1860 establishments in England
1968 disestablishments in England
Beeching closures in England